Albert James Aldridge (born 13 April 1864 – died 22 June 1891) was an English footballer who played as a full back. He was born in Walsall, won the FA Cup in 1888 and represented the England national football team twice.

Career
Aldridge started his career, as a Youth Player, at hometown club Walsall Swifts where he spent six seasons (five as a Youth Player and one as a Senior Player). He played in nine FA Cup ties and scored one goal, in a third round win over Mitchell St George's in January 1885.

In March 1886 Aldridge moved to West Bromwich Albion where he earned his first cap for England in a British Home Championship match against Ireland in Belfast. He had great success in the FA Cup while at West Bromwich Albion, helping them to the final in 1887, and to win the trophy in 1888 by beating the much-fancied Preston North End in the final.

Despite his cup heroics, Aldridge moved back to the newly merged Walsall Town Swifts during that summer. He played in 13 matches in the Midland Association for the Saddlers in 1888–1889 and earned his second, and final, England cap in a match against Ireland in the British Home Championship at Anfield. Aldridge was the second player to play for England while at Walsall, after Alf Jones who appeared for the national side while playing for Walsall Swifts in 1882.

Season 1889-1890

In August 1889 Aldridge joined Aston Villa, where he made 17 appearances in the League as Villa finished eighth. His club and League Debut was on the 7 September 1889 at Wellington Road, Perry Barr when Burnley were the visitors. The Cricket and Football Field of 7 September 1889 reported on the match. It was 1-1 at Half-Time and 2-2 at Full-Time. Aldridge played at Left-Back. Aldridge got a couple of mentions as he did some good defensive work.  His last match was on 28 December 1889 when Villa travelled to County Ground, Derby. Aldridge played in a less familiar position, Right-Back. Aston Villa lost 5-0. The “poor health” referred to in ‘Matthews” meant he missed the rest of the season. Villa kept Aldridge on the books until April 1891, a few months before Aldridge passed away.

Death
Aldridge died on 22 June 1891 at his home in Walsall, due to poor health. He was only 27 years old.>

Honours
West Bromwich Albion
FA Cup winner: 1888
FA Cup runner-up: 1887

References

External links

1863 births
1891 deaths
Sportspeople from Walsall
English footballers
England international footballers
Association football fullbacks
Walsall F.C. players
Aston Villa F.C. players
West Bromwich Albion F.C. players
English Football League players
FA Cup Final players